Maria Sharapova defeated Simona Halep in the final, 6–4, 6–7(5–7), 6–4 to win the women's singles tennis title at the 2014 French Open. It was her second French Open title and fifth major title overall. In a final that lasted over three hours, it was the first time since 2001 that the final went to three sets. Halep became the first Romanian to reach the final since Virginia Ruzici in 1980.

Serena Williams was the defending champion, but was defeated in the second round by Garbiñe Muguruza.

The top three seeds (Williams, Li Na and Agnieszka Radwańska) were in contention for the world No. 1 ranking. However, they all failed to reach the fourth round and so Williams retained the top spot. As a result, this marked the first time in the Open Era the top three seeds failed to reach the fourth round of a major.

Seeds 

  Serena Williams (second round)
  Li Na (first round)
  Agnieszka Radwańska (third round)
  Simona Halep (final)
  Petra Kvitová (third round)
  Jelena Janković (fourth round)
  Maria Sharapova (champion)
  Angelique Kerber (fourth round)
  Dominika Cibulková (third round)
  Sara Errani (quarterfinals)
  Ana Ivanovic (third round)
  Flavia Pennetta (second round)
  Caroline Wozniacki (first round)
  Carla Suárez Navarro (quarterfinals)
  Sloane Stephens (fourth round)
  Sabine Lisicki (second round, retired because of a right wrist injury)

  Roberta Vinci (first round)
  Eugenie Bouchard (semifinals)
  Samantha Stosur (fourth round)
  Alizé Cornet (second round)
  Kirsten Flipkens (second round)
  Ekaterina Makarova (third round)
  Lucie Šafářová (fourth round)
  Anastasia Pavlyuchenkova (second round, retired because of back pain)
  Kaia Kanepi (first round)
  Sorana Cîrstea (third round)
  Svetlana Kuznetsova (quarterfinals)
  Andrea Petkovic (semifinals)
  Venus Williams (second round)
  Klára Koukalová (first round)
  Daniela Hantuchová (third round)
  Elena Vesnina (second round)

Qualifying

Draw

Finals

Top half

Section 1

Section 2

Section 3

Section 4

Bottom half

Section 5

Section 6

Section 7

Section 8

Final
Seventh-seeded Sharapova beat 18th-seeded Eugenie Bouchard 4–6, 7–5, 6–2 in the first semi-final, while fourth-seeded Simona Halep beat 28th-seeded Andrea Petkovic, 6–2, 7–6(7–4) in the second. In the first set, Halep won the first two games before Sharapova won five consecutive games. Halep fought back and narrowed the margin to 5–4, before Sharapova broke Halep to win the set 6–4. The second set went to a tiebreaker where Sharapova jumped out to a 5–3 lead. However, Halep won the next four points to take the set 7–6(7–5). While leading 2–1 in the third set, Halep had break point but Sharapova recovered and won the game. She then broke Halep to take a 4–2 lead. Halep held, then broke back to level the set at 4–4, but got broken again in the next game. Serving for the match, Sharapova held at love, taking the set 6–4. It was the first time since 2001 that the final went to 3 sets.

Championship match statistics

References

External links 
 Main draw
2014 French Open – Women's draws and results at the International Tennis Federation

Women's Singles
French Open by year – Women's singles
French Open - Women's Singles
2014 in women's tennis
2014 in French women's sport